Pietro Luigi Malaspina, C.R. (1637 – December, 1705) was a Roman Catholic prelate who served as Bishop of Massa Marittima (1695–1705) and Bishop of Cortona (1684–1695).

Biography
Pietro Luigi Malaspina was born in Florence, Italy in 1637 and ordained a priest in the Congregation of Clerics Regular of the Divine Providence. On 2 October 1684, he was appointed during the papacy of Pope Innocent XI as Bishop of Cortona. On 8 October 1684, he was consecrated bishop by Alessandro Crescenzi (cardinal), Cardinal-Priest of Santa Prisca, with Pier Antonio Capobianco, Bishop Emeritus of Lacedonia, and Benedetto Bartolo, Bishop of Belcastro, serving as co-consecrators. On 2 May 1695, he was appointed during the papacy of Pope Innocent XII as Bishop of Massa Marittima. He served as Bishop of Massa Marittima until his death in December 1705.

References

External links and additional sources
 (for Chronology of Bishops) 
 (for Chronology of Bishops) 
 (for Chronology of Bishops) 
 (for Chronology of Bishops) 

17th-century Italian Roman Catholic bishops
Bishops appointed by Pope Innocent XI
Bishops appointed by Pope Innocent XII
1637 births
1705 deaths
Clergy from Florence
Theatine bishops